Arjoun (also spelled Arcun or Arjoon), is a village in central Syria, administratively part of the Homs Governorate, located southwest of Homs. Nearby localities include Aqrabiyah to the southwest, al-Qusayr to the southeast, al-Dabaah to the east, Kafr Mousa and al-Ghassaniya to the north and al-Houz to the northwest. According to the Central Bureau of Statistics (CBS), Arjoun had a population of 2,465 in the 2004 census. Its inhabitants are predominantly Sunni Muslims.

19th-century Biblical scholars identified Arjoun as "Argana" where in 854 BCE the Neo-Assyrian king Shalmaneser II fought the army of Hadadezer in the Battle of Qarqar. Other sources insist that Argana was located somewhere north of modern-day Hama. An Ancient Roman milestone was found in the village, suggesting it was situated on a Roman road. In his visit to Syria, James Silk Buckingham described Arjoun in the early 19th century as a small village lying below an artificial mound. At the mound's summit was the tomb of a local sheikh surrounded by a few buildings.

References

Bibliography

Populated places in al-Qusayr District